Gibbs Crawfurd Antrobus  (17 June 1793 – 21 May 1861) was a British diplomat and politician.

Biography
The brother of Sir Edmund Antrobus, 2nd Baronet, Antrobus's wealthy family were long-established in Congleton, Cheshire. His mother died giving birth to him, and his father died later of a riding accident, having been in a coma since before his son's birth. He was educated at Eton, at St John's College, Cambridge, and then at Lincoln's Inn. He married firstly, on 25 June 1827, Jane Trotter (who died on 24 November 1829), daughter of Sir Coutts Trotter, 1st baronet, of Westerville, Lincolnshire, and secondly, on 12 January 1832, Charlotte Crofton, daughter of Sir Edward Crofton, 3rd baronet, of Mote, County Roscommon.

In 1816 he joined the diplomatic service, serving in the United States until 1821.

In the general election in 1820 he was elected in his absence as a Member of Parliament (MP) for the rotten borough of Aldborough, in the interest of the Duke of Newcastle.

In the 1826 election he was returned for the rotten borough of Plympton Erle, as a paying guest of the Treby family who controlled the borough.  He held the seat until the 1832 general election,
when the borough was disenfranchised under the Reform Act.

He was Sheriff of Cheshire from 1834 to 1835.

References

External links 
  (Aldborough)
  (Plympton Erle)
 

1793 births
1861 deaths
People from Congleton
People educated at Eton College
Alumni of St John's College, Cambridge
British diplomats
Members of the Parliament of the United Kingdom for Plympton Erle
UK MPs 1820–1826
UK MPs 1826–1830
UK MPs 1830–1831
UK MPs 1831–1832
Members of Lincoln's Inn
Deputy Lieutenants of Cheshire
English justices of the peace
High Sheriffs of Cheshire